The Bridle Trails neighborhood can refer to a neighborhood in one of the following cities:  Bellevue, Washington; Kirkland, Washington; or Redmond, Washington.  It is so named for being adjacent to Bridle Trails State Park.  Many of the properties in these neighborhoods have equestrian facilities such as barns and pastures.

External links 
Bridle Trails Community Club
South Rose Hills/Bridle Trails Neighborhood Association of Kirkland

Neighborhoods in Bellevue, Washington
Neighborhoods in Kirkland, Washington